Engine Common is a village  in the civil parish of Iron Acton in South Gloucestershire, England.  It lies about 1 mile north west of Yate.

References

External links

Villages in South Gloucestershire District